Translation as a rhetorical device is a form of parody, where a sarcastic paraphrase of a source quotation is given to mock its author; to enhance the irony, it is furthermore stated that the version being given is merely a translation into the speaker's language, implying that the original speaker was unduly obscure or ranting. Given the nature of Usenet forums, parodic translation is prevalent in flame wars, where remarks such as "Translation: 'I do not have a clue and am throwing mud'" are used to imply — on very little ground — that another poster is not making any appreciable contribution to the subject.

Unlike other forms of parody, translation has a relatively recent history; early usages of the device can be seen in the work of the Viennese literary critic and journalist Karl Kraus,  who claimed to translate from other journalists' — famously former friend Harden — and from Moskauderwelch — a derisive term for the highly elaborate Marxist jargon of the time, a pun on Moskau, Moscow, and Kauderwelch, gibberish. Kraus' influence is notable in Karl Popper; while translation of scientific theories into verificationist terms had been a standard procedure in logical positivism for some time, Popper's criticism of several philosophers and scientists that failed to comply with his notion of the scientific method took a mocking quality reminiscent of the former.

Rhetoric
Satire